Sveinn Brynjólfsson (born 27 July 1975) is an Icelandic alpine skier. He competed in the men's slalom at the 1998 Winter Olympics.

Biography

References

1975 births
Living people
Sveinn Brynjólfsson
Sveinn Brynjólfsson
Alpine skiers at the 1998 Winter Olympics
Sveinn Brynjólfsson
20th-century Icelandic people